The Sopranos, an American crime drama television series created by David Chase that aired on the premium cable network HBO between 1999 and 2007, won and was nominated for a variety of different awards. The show won 21 Primetime Emmy Awards in 111 nominations. The series was nominated for the Primetime Emmy Award for Outstanding Drama Series seven times, in every year eligible, winning in 2004 (as the first series on a cable network to do so) and 2007. It also won five Golden Globe Awards in 23 nominations, including a win for Best Drama Series for its first season in 2000. The series was honored with two consecutive Peabody Awards in 2000 and 2001, and also won several major guild awards for its actors, directors, producers, and writers.

Additionally, because of the long hiatuses between certain seasons, the series was intermittently ineligible for awards.

Lead actor James Gandolfini and lead actress Edie Falco received the most nominations and wins of the ensemble cast, including three wins each for the Primetime Emmy Award, in their respective categories; as well as Falco winning the Golden Globe Award in 2000 and 2003, and Gandolfini winning in 2000. David Chase also received numerous accolades for his work on the series as a director, producer and writer, including the Primetime Emmy Award for Outstanding Writing for a Drama Series on three occasions. The Sopranos received 16 Directors Guild of America Award nominations, winning two of them; its four nominations in 2000 set a record for most nominations for a series in one category in a year. It received six Producers Guild of America Award nominations, winning three of them. At the Screen Actors Guild Awards, Gandolfini and Falco were honored three times each, and the entire cast also won for Outstanding Performance by an Ensemble in a Drama Series in 2000 and 2008. The show won four Writers Guild of America Awards from 11 nominations and 12 TCA Awards from 24 nominations. Its five nominations and four wins at the TCA Awards in 1999 set records for most nominations and wins in a year.

Awards and nominations

Notes

Nominees for awards

Other

References

External links
 Awards for The Sopranos at Internet Movie Database

Awards
Lists of awards by television series